Mesocapromys is a genus of rodent in the subfamily Capromyinae. The genus is restricted to Cuba and associated islands.

Systematics
Mesocapromys contains the five following species:
 Cabrera's hutia (Mesocapromys angelcabrerai)
 Eared hutia (Mesocapromys auritus)
 Black-tailed hutia (Mesocapromys melanurus)
 Dwarf hutia (Mesocapromys nana)
 San Felipe hutia (Mesocapromys sanfelipensis)

Phylogeny
Within Capromyidae, the closest relative of Mesocapromys is the genus Mysateles. Both genera are the sister group to Capromys, and then Geocapromys is a more distant genus. In turn, these four genera belong to the tribe Capromyini, and are the sister group to Plagiodontia.

References

 
Hutias
Rodent genera
Taxonomy articles created by Polbot